50.Grind was an English electronic rock group, headed up by  Nick Atkinson, who then became the lead singer of English rock band Rooster. Their 2001 song, Gotta Catch 'Em All, made #57 on the UK Singles Chart.

Discography
2001: Gotta Catch 'Em All (single)

References

2001 establishments in England
2001 disestablishments in England
English electronic rock musical groups
Musical groups established in 2001
Musical groups disestablished in 2001